Shaun McCutcheon is a businessman and electrical engineer from suburban Birmingham, Alabama. He is the inventor and developer of innovative industrial electric devices including a large-scale imploding circuit breaker and a multi-polar electric motor / generator.  He is also the successful plaintiff in the Supreme Court case McCutcheon v. FEC, a landmark campaign finance decision.

Career 
After graduating from the Georgia Institute of Technology, McCutcheon began working as an electrical engineer, installing motor drives and electrical equipment for manufacturing industries.

In 1996, he founded Coalmont Electrical Development Corporation, an engineering firm specializing in complex electrical systems. McCutcheon currently serves as Coalmont’s CEO.

McCutcheon v. FEC 
McCutcheon rose to national prominence when he filed a lawsuit against the Federal Election Commission (FEC) in 2012. McCutcheon specifically challenged the FEC’s “aggregate contribution limits,” which had imposed a cap on contributions an individual could make over a two-year period to national party and federal candidate committees.

With the help of attorney and campaign finance expert Dan Backer and the Republican National Committee, McCutcheon’s case rose to the Supreme Court. In 2014, the Court ruled in McCutcheon’s favor by a 5-4 margin, claiming the FEC’s aggregate contribution limits violated the First Amendment.

Political activity 
McCutcheon is a Republican donor and conservative activist. In May 2020, McCutcheon filed to run for president as a Libertarian.

References 

Year of birth missing (living people)
Living people
American chief executives
American electrical engineers
Georgia Tech alumni
Businesspeople from Birmingham, Alabama